Acmaeoderopsis rockefelleri is a species of metallic wood-boring beetle in the family Buprestidae. It is found in Central America and North America. It lives on Acacia constricta and Prosopia juliflora.

References

Further reading

 
 
 

Buprestidae
Articles created by Qbugbot
Beetles described in 1951
Beetles of North America